Klamath is an album by the American Music Club singer/songwriter Mark Eitzel. Released by Decor in 2009, it was his first solo album since Candy Ass, in 2005. All of the songs were written by Eitzel.

Eitzel himself printed and manufactured the album; friends mailed the copies.

Critical reception
The Independent called it "gorgeous and every bit as good as those early American Music Club records." The Herald considered it a "simple, beautiful record."

Track listing
 "Buried Treasure"
 "Like a River That Reaches The Sea"
 "The Blood on My Hands"
 "I Miss You"
 "There's Someone Waiting"
 "What Do You Got for Me"
 "The White of Gold"
 "I Live in This Place"
 "Why I'm Bullshit"
 "Remember"
 "Antennas"
 "Ronald Koal was a Rock Star"

References

External links

2009 albums
Mark Eitzel albums
Decor albums